Grindrod may refer to:

Grindrod (surname), including a list of people with the name
Grindrod, British Columbia
Grindrod Bank (GRDB), a commercial bank in South Africa
Grindrod Locomotives, a South African railway locomotive manufacturer